The Haunting of Morella is a 1990 horror film directed by Jim Wynorski. The film began shooting on September 13, 1989, in Los Angeles. It was released sporadically across the midwest United States in February 1990 where it performed poorly at the box office.

Plot
A witch named Morella is put to death in Colonial America, leaving behind her husband and infant daughter, Lenora. Seventeen years later, Lenora has grown up and stands to inherit money arranged by her mother, Morella's family. With the stage set, Morella wants to return to life by taking over her daughter, Lenora's body.

Cast

Production
Principal photography on The Haunting of Morella began on September 13, 1989, in Los Angeles, under the title The Haunting of Maurella. Although director Jim Wynorski is not credited in the credits as the screenwriter, several sources (such as Variety) stated he was a screenwriter during production. The character Miles Archer was invented for the film.

Release
The Haunting of Morella was released on February 9, 1990, in Detroit. 
In February 1990, Daily Variety noted the film opened "timidly" in only sixty theaters through the Midwest, where ticket sales were described as "weak," "tepid," and "dismal."

Reception
Kyle Leonard wrote in the 1991 Motion Picture Guide that the film was "nothing more than an excuse for its female characters to take off their clothes and kill each other." The review went on to note that "Eggert shows some depth in her portrayal of the wholly innocent Lenora and the equally wicked Morella [...] one wonders how she got herself into this softcore horror film." A critic credited as "Advo." wrote in Variety declared "Nudity, lesbianism, softcore sex, beer barrel-breasted babes: The Haunting of Morella has it all. But that's still not enough to give this predictable dull rendering of an Edgar Allan Poe tale much life at the boxoffice."

References

Sources

External links

Review at Mondo Digital

1990 films
Films directed by Jim Wynorski
1990 horror films
Films based on works by Edgar Allan Poe
American horror films
1990s English-language films
1990s American films